Tom Oliver Bacon (born 25 February 1993) is a British speedway rider.

Career
Bacon began his British career riding for the Mildenhall Fen Tigers in 2015. In 2017, he signed for Peterborough Panthers, where he spent two seasons with the club for the SGB Championship 2017 and the SGB Championship 2018 seasons.

In 2019, he joined Redcar Bears for one season and then rode in the top tier of British Speedway, riding for the Wolverhampton Wolves in the SGB Premiership 2021, in addition to the Kent Kings in the SGB Championship 2021.

References 

1993 births
Living people
British speedway riders
Birmingham Brummies riders
Kent Kings riders
Mildenhall Fen Tigers riders
Peterborough Panthers riders
Redcar Bears riders
Wolverhampton Wolves riders